Mariestad is a locality and the seat of Mariestad Municipality, Västra Götaland County, Sweden. It had 16,611 inhabitants in 2019. Until 1997 it was the capital of the former Skaraborg County and an episcopal see in the Church of Sweden between 1583 and 1646.

History

The city was founded in 1583 by Duke Charles, who later became King Charles IX of Sweden. The city is named after the his wife Marie of Pfalz. The coat of arms for Mariestad, an ox stepping out of the water, is said to be what Marie of Pfalz saw by the bay of Tidan in Mariestad when she first arrived there.

Diocese
Mariestad is one of two Swedish cities with a cathedral without a bishop's seat, the other being Kalmar. For political reasons, the diocese of Mariestad was presided over by a superintendent rather than a bishop from 1583 until 1646, when the superintendent was moved to Karlstad and the diocese of Mariestad was absorbed by that of Skara.

Notable natives 
 Gustavus Schmidt (1795–1877), American lawyer and lecturer
 Axel Lindahl (1841–1906), photographer
 Dag Wennlund (born 1963), javelin thrower
 Evelyn Mok (born 1987), actress and comedian
 Helena Andersson
 Anni Dewani

Sports
The following sports clubs are located in Mariestad:

 IFK Mariestad
 Mariestads BK
 Mariestad BoIS HC
 IBK Lockerud Mariestad

Climate 
Mariestad has a maritime climate influenced by its position on lake Vänern and the relative proximity to the North Atlantic. The town has warmer weather than elsewhere in western Sweden due to the influence of Vänern counterbalancing the low-pressure systems from further west. Mariestad is also shielded behind the archipelago and the peninsula to its west, which makes it warmer than areas further southwest on the lake shore. Summer nights are very mild by inland standards due to the lake influence. Winters are often mild with infrequent snow cover with the lake being large enough to provide further moderation of cold snaps compared to towns on the east coast like Norrköping and Nyköping on the same latitude. Vänern often remains in a liquid state during winters due to mild temperatures.

References 

Populated lakeshore places in Sweden
Populated places in Västra Götaland County
Populated places in Mariestad Municipality
Municipal seats of Västra Götaland County
Swedish municipal seats
Populated places established in 1583